The following are Government of Tamil Nadu Departments

Introduction

This a List of Government of Tamil Nadu's:
 Departments headed by Principal Secretary (India) to the Government
 Departments headed by Director (or) Commissioner of the Government

Tamil Nadu Government's Secretariat Departments (Head)

There are 260 Secretariat Departments as follows:
 Department of Home, Prohibition and Excise (Tamil Nadu) 
 Department of Welfare of Differently Abled Persons (Tamil Nadu)
 Department of Adi Dravidar and Tribal Welfare (Tamil Nadu)	
 Department of Agriculture (Tamil Nadu)
 Department of Animal Husbandry, Dairying and Fisheries (Tamil Nadu) 
 Department of Backward Classes, Most Backward Classes and Minorities Welfare (Tamil Nadu)
 Department of Co-operation, Food and Consumer Protection (Tamil Nadu)
 Department of Commercial Taxes and Registration (Tamil Nadu)
 Department of Energy (Tamil Nadu)
 Department of Environment and Forests (Tamil Nadu)
 Department of Finance (Tamil Nadu)
 Department of Handlooms, Handicrafts, Textiles and Khadi (Tamil Nadu)
 Department of Health and Family Welfare (Tamil Nadu)
 Department of Higher Education (Tamil Nadu) 
 Department of Highways and Minor Ports (Tamil Nadu) 
 Department of Industries (Tamil Nadu) 
 Department of Information Technology and Digital Services (Tamil Nadu)
 Department of Labour and Employment (Tamil Nadu) 
 Department of Law (Tamil Nadu) 
 Department of Legislative Assembly (Tamil Nadu) 
 Department of Municipal Administration and Water Supply (Tamil Nadu) 
 Department of Micro, Small and Medium Enterprises (Tamil Nadu) (formerly Small Industries Department )
 Department of Personnel and Administrative Reforms (Tamil Nadu) 
 Department of Planning, Development and Special Initiatives (Tamil Nadu) 
 Department of Public (Tamil Nadu) 
 Department of Public Works (Tamil Nadu)
 Department of Revenue (Tamil Nadu) 
 Department of Rural Development and Panchayat (Tamil Nadu) 
 Department of School Education (Tamil Nadu)
 Department of Social Reforms Department (Tamil Nadu)
 Department of Social Welfare and Nutritious Meal Programme (Tamil Nadu) 
 Department of Special Programme Implementation (Tamil Nadu) 
 Department of Tourism and Culture (Tamil Nadu) 
 Department of Tamil Development, Religious Endowments and Information (Tamil Nadu) 
 Department of Transport (Tamil Nadu)
 Department of Youth Welfare and Sports (Tamil Nadu)

See also
 Government of Tamil Nadu
 Legislature of Tamil Nadu
 Chief Ministers of Tamil Nadu
 Governors of Tamil Nadu
 Government of India
 List of Tamil Nadu Government Agencies
 Tamil Nadu Council of Ministers
 Union Government ministries of India

References 
 List of Departments

External links 
 Government of Tamil Nadu - Departments

Tamil Nadu state government departments
State government departments of India